Breeding Death is the first EP by Bloodbath. It was released on 8 February 2000 by Century Media Records.

Release
Breeding Death was initially released on 8 February 2000 on Century Media Records and re-released on CD in 2006 with two bonus demo tracks It was released on vinyl in January 2010 by Animate Records, with the first 200 copies were pressed on gold wax. The LP includes the two bonus demo tracks. Side B has laser engraving.

Track listing

 Note: "Omnious Bloodvomit" is often misspelled as "Ominous Bloodvomit"

Personnel
Mikael Åkerfeldt – lead vocals
Anders "Blakkheim" Nyström – guitar
Jonas Renkse – bass guitar, backing vocals
Dan Swanö – drums, backing vocals, production, engineering
Axel Hermann – album cover art

References

2000 debut EPs
Bloodbath albums
Century Media Records EPs
Albums produced by Dan Swanö